Stuttering, also known as stammering, is a speech disorder in which the flow of speech is disrupted by involuntary repetitions and prolongations of sounds, syllables, words, or phrases as well as involuntary silent pauses or blocks in which the person who stutters is unable to produce sounds. The term stuttering is most commonly associated with involuntary sound repetition, but it also encompasses the abnormal hesitation or pausing before speech, referred to by people who stutter as blocks, and the prolongation of certain sounds, usually vowels or semivowels. According to Watkins et al., stuttering is a disorder of "selection, initiation, and execution of motor sequences necessary for fluent speech production". For many people who stutter, repetition is the main concern. The term "stuttering" covers a wide range of severity, from barely perceptible impediments that are largely cosmetic to severe symptoms that effectively prevent oral communication. Almost 70 million people worldwide stutter, about 1% of the world's population.

The impact of stuttering on a person's functioning and emotional state can be severe. This may include fears of having to enunciate specific vowels or consonants, fears of being caught stuttering in social situations, self-imposed isolation, anxiety, stress, shame, low self-esteem, being a possible target of bullying (especially in children), having to use word substitution and rearrange words in a sentence to hide stuttering, or a feeling of "loss of control" during speech. Stuttering is sometimes popularly seen as a symptom of anxiety, but there is no direct correlation in that direction.

Stuttering is generally not a problem with the physical production of speech sounds or putting thoughts into words. Acute nervousness and stress are not thought to cause stuttering, but they can trigger stuttering in people who have the speech disorder, and living with a stigmatized disability can result in anxiety and high allostatic stress load (chronic nervousness and stress) that increase the amount of acute stress necessary to trigger stuttering in any given person who stutters, worsening the situation in the manner of a positive feedback system; the name 'stuttered speech syndrome' has been proposed for this condition. Neither acute nor chronic stress, however, itself creates any predisposition to stuttering.

The disorder is also variable, which means that in certain situations, such as talking on the telephone or in a large group, the stuttering might be more severe or less, depending on whether or not the person who stutters is self-conscious about their stuttering. People who stutter often find that their stuttering fluctuates and that they have "good" days, "bad" days and "stutter-free" days. The times in which their stuttering fluctuates can be random. Although the exact etiology, or cause, of stuttering is unknown, both genetics and neurophysiology are thought to contribute. There are many treatments and speech therapy techniques available that may help decrease speech disfluency in some people who stutter to the point where an untrained ear cannot identify a problem; however, there is essentially no cure for the disorder at present. The severity of the person's stuttering would correspond to the amount of speech therapy needed to decrease disfluency. For severe stuttering, long-term therapy and hard work is required to decrease disfluency.

Characteristics

Common behaviors
Common stuttering behaviors are observable signs of speech disfluencies, for example: repeating sounds, syllables, words or phrases, silent blocks and prolongation of sounds. These differ from the normal disfluencies found in all speakers in that stuttering disfluencies may last longer, occur more frequently, and are produced with more effort and strain. Stuttering disfluencies also vary in quality: common disfluencies tend to be repeated movements, fixed postures, or superfluous behaviors. Each of these three categories is composed of subgroups of stutters and disfluencies.
Repeated movements
 Syllable repetition—a single syllable word is repeated (for example: on—on—on a chair) or a part of a word which is still a full syllable such as "un—un—under the ..." and "o—o—open".
 Incomplete syllable repetition—an incomplete syllable is repeated, such as a consonant without a vowel, for example, "c—c—c—cold".
 Multi-syllable repetition—more than one syllable such as a whole word, or more than one word is repeated, such as "I know—I know—I know a lot of information."
 Fixed postures
 With audible airflow—prolongation of a sound occurs such as "mmmmmmmmmom".
 Without audible airflow—such as a block of speech or a tense pause where nothing is said despite efforts.
Superfluous behaviors
 Verbal—this includes an interjection such as an unnecessary uh or um as well as revisions, such as going back and correcting one's initial statements such as "I—My girlfriend ...", where the I has been corrected to the word my.
 Nonverbal—these are visible or audible speech behaviors, such as lip smacking, throat clearing, head thrusting, etc., usually representing an effort to break through or circumvent a block or stuttering loop.

Variability
The severity of a stutter is often not constant even for people who severely stutter. Stutterers commonly report dramatically increased fluency when talking in unison with another speaker, copying another's speech, whispering, singing, and acting or when talking to pets, young children, or themselves. Other situations, such as public speaking and speaking on the telephone, are often greatly feared, and increased stuttering is reported.

Feelings and attitudes
Stuttering could have a significant negative cognitive and affective impact on the person who stutters. It has been described in terms of the analogy to an iceberg, with the immediately visible and audible symptoms of stuttering above the waterline and a broader set of symptoms such as negative emotions hidden below the surface. Feelings of embarrassment, shame, frustration, fear, anger, and guilt are frequent in people who stutter, and may actually increase tension and effort, leading to increased stuttering. With time, continued exposure to difficult speaking experiences may crystallize into a negative self-concept and self-image. Many perceive stutterers as less intelligent due to their disfluency; however, as a group, individuals who stutter tend to be of above average intelligence. People who stutter may project their attitudes onto others, believing that the others think them nervous or stupid. Such negative feelings and attitudes may need to be a major focus of a treatment program.

Many people who stutter report a high emotional cost, including jobs or promotions not received, as well as relationships broken or not pursued.

Fluency and disfluency
Linguistic tasks can invoke speech disfluency. People who stutter may experience varying disfluency. Tasks that trigger disfluency usually require a controlled-language processing, which involves linguistic planning. In stuttering, it is seen that many individuals do not demonstrate disfluencies when it comes to tasks that allow for automatic processing without substantial planning. For example, singing "Happy Birthday" or other relatively common, repeated linguistic discourses, could be fluid in people who stutter. Tasks like this reduce semantic, syntactic, and prosodic planning, whereas spontaneous, "controlled" speech or reading aloud requires thoughts to transform into linguistic material and thereafter syntax and prosody. Some researchers hypothesize that controlled-language activated circuitry consistently does not function properly in people who stutter, whereas people who do not stutter only sometimes display disfluent speech and abnormal circuitry.

Associated conditions 
Stuttering co-occurs with other learning disorders. These associated disabilities include:

Attention deficit hyperactivity disorder (ADHD): A disorder characterized by problems sustaining attention, hyperactivity, or acting impulsively.
Dyslexia: A disorder involving difficulties with reading and spelling. The prevalence rate of childhood stuttering in dyslexia is around 30-40%, while in adults the prevalence of dyslexia in adults who stutter is around 30-50%.
autism spectrum disorder 
 intellectual disability
 language or learning disability
 seizure disorders
 social anxiety disorder 
 speech sound disorders
 other developmental disorders

Causes
No single, exclusive cause of developmental stuttering is known. A variety of hypotheses and theories suggest multiple factors contributing to stuttering. Among these is the strong evidence that stuttering has a genetic basis. Children who have first-degree relatives who stutter are three times as likely to develop a stutter. However, twin and adoption studies suggest that genetic factors interact with environmental factors for stuttering to occur, and many stutterers have no family history of the disorder.
There is evidence that stuttering is more common in children who also have concurrent speech, language, learning or motor difficulties. Robert West, a pioneer of genetic studies in stuttering, has suggested that the presence of stuttering is connected to the fact that articulated speech is the last major acquisition in human evolution.

Another view is that a stutter or stammer is a complex tic. This view is held for the following reasons. It always arises from repetition of sounds or words. Young children like repetition and the more tense they are feeling, the more they like this outlet for their tension – an understandable and quite normal reaction. They are capable of repeating all types of behaviour. The more tension that is felt, the less one likes change. The more change, the greater can be the repetition. So, when a three-year-old finds he has a new baby brother or sister he may start repeating sounds. The repetitions can become conditioned and automatic and ensuing struggles against the repetitions result in prolongations and blocks in his speech. More boys stammer than girls, in the ratio of 3–4 boys : 1 girl. This is because the male hypothalamic-pituitary-adrenal (HPA) axis is more active. As males produce more cortisol than females under the same provocation, they can be tense or anxious and become repetitive.

In a 2010 article, three genes were found by Dennis Drayna and team to correlate with stuttering: GNPTAB, GNPTG, and NAGPA. Researchers estimated that alterations in these three genes were present in 9% of those who have a family history of stuttering.

For some people who stutter, congenital factors may play a role. These may include physical trauma at or around birth, learning disabilities, and cerebral palsy. In others, there could be added impact due to stressful situations such as the birth of a sibling, moving, or a sudden growth in linguistic ability.

There is clear empirical evidence for structural and functional differences in the brains of stutterers. Research is complicated somewhat by the possibility that such differences could be the consequences of stuttering rather than a cause, but recent research on older children confirms structural differences thereby giving strength to the argument that at least some of the differences are not a consequence of stuttering.

Auditory processing deficits have also been proposed as a cause of stuttering. Stuttering is less prevalent in deaf and hard-of-hearing individuals, and stuttering may be reduced when auditory feedback is altered, such as by masking, delayed auditory feedback (DAF), or frequency altered feedback. There is some evidence that the functional organization of the auditory cortex may be different in people who stutter.

There is evidence of differences in linguistic processing between people who stutter and people who do not. Brain scans of adult stutterers have found greater activation of the right hemisphere, which is associated with emotions, than of the left hemisphere, which is associated with speech. In addition, reduced activation in the left auditory cortex has been observed.

The capacities and demands model has been proposed to account for the heterogeneity of the disorder. In this approach, speech performance varies depending on the capacity that the individual has for producing fluent speech, and the demands placed upon the person by the speaking situation. Capacity for fluent speech may be affected by a predisposition to the disorder, auditory processing or motor speech deficits, and cognitive or affective issues. Demands may be increased by internal factors such as lack of confidence or self esteem or inadequate language skills or external factors such as peer pressure, time pressure, stressful speaking situations, insistence on perfect speech, and the like. In stuttering, the severity of the disorder is seen as likely to increase when demands placed on the person's speech and language system exceed their capacity to deal with these pressures. However, the precise nature of the capacity or incapacity has not been delineated.

Mechanism

Physiology
Though neuroimaging studies have not yet found specific neural correlates, there is much evidence that the brains of adults who stutter differ from the brains of adults who do not stutter. Several neuroimaging studies have emerged to identify areas associated with stuttering. In general, during stuttering, cerebral activities change dramatically in comparison to silent rest or fluent speech between people who stutter and people who do not. There is evidence that people who stutter activate motor programs before the articulatory or linguistic processing is initiated. Brain imaging studies have primarily been focused on adults. However, the neurological abnormalities found in adults does not determine whether childhood stuttering caused these abnormalities or whether the abnormalities cause stuttering.

Studies utilizing positron emission tomography (PET) have found during tasks that invoke disfluent speech, people who stutter show hypoactivity in cortical areas associated with language processing, such as Broca's area, but hyperactivity in areas associated with motor function. One such study that evaluated the stutter period found that there was overactivation in the cerebrum and cerebellum, and relative deactivation of the left hemisphere auditory areas and frontal temporal regions.

Functional magnetic resonance imaging (fMRI) has found abnormal activation in the right frontal operculum (RFO), which is an area associated with time-estimation tasks, occasionally incorporated in complex speech.

Researchers have explored temporal cortical activations by utilizing magnetoencephalography (MEG). In single-word-recognition tasks, people who did not stutter showed cortical activation first in occipital areas, then in left inferior-frontal regions such as Broca's area, and finally, in motor and premotor cortices. The stutterers also first had cortical activation in the occipital areas but the left inferior-frontal regions were activated only after the motor and premotor cortices were activated.

During speech production, people who stutter show overactivity in the anterior insula, cerebellum and bilateral midbrain. They show underactivity in the ventral premotor, Rolandic opercular and sensorimotor cortex bilaterally and Heschl's gyrus in the left hemisphere. Additionally, speech production yields underactivity in cortical motor and premotor areas.

Abnormal lateralization
Much evidence from neuroimaging techniques has supported the theory that the right hemisphere of people who stutter interferes with left-hemisphere speech production.

In 2008, it was shown that adults who stutter have anatomical differences in gyri within the perisylvian cortex, in frontotemporal areas. A large amount of white matter is found in the right hemisphere of the brain, including the region of the superior temporal gyrus. This was discovered using voxel-based morphometry. On the other hand, lesser amounts of white matter are found in the left inferior arcuate fasciculus connecting the temporal and frontal areas in stuttering adults.

As of 2011 it was known that the corpus callosum, which transfers information between the left and right cerebral hemispheres.  rostrum, and the anterior mid-body sections were larger in adults who stutter as compared to normally fluent adults. This difference was thought to be due to unusual functions of brain organization in stuttering adults or a result of how the stuttering adults performed language-relevant tasks. Furthermore, previous research had found that adults who stutter show cerebral hemispheres that contain uncommon brain proportions and allocations of gray and white matter tissue.
There is less coordination between the speech motor and planning regions in the brain's left hemisphere of men and women who stutter, when compared to a non-stuttering control group. Anatomical connectivity of the speech motor and planning regions is less vigorous in adults who stutter, especially women. Men who stutter seem to have more right-sided motor connectivity. On the other hand, stuttering women have less connectivity with the right motor regions.

In non-stuttering, normal speech, PET scans have shown that both hemispheres are active but that the left hemisphere may be more active. By contrast, people who stutter yield more activity on the right hemisphere, suggesting that it might be interfering with left-hemisphere speech production. Another comparison of scans anterior forebrain regions are disproportionately active in stuttering subjects, while post-rolandic regions are relatively inactive.

Bilateral increases and unusual right-left asymmetry has been found in the planum temporale when comparing people who stutter and people who do not. These studies have also found that there are anatomical differences in the Rolandic operculum and arcuate fasciculus.

In 2019, Denis Drayna suggested that brain imaging studies of people who stutter do not tell if the differences in the brain anatomy caused stuttering or if they are the effect of stuttering;In the mouse model for stuttering created by Drayna and team, they noticed significant similarities between the vocalizations in mice (carrying GNPTAB mutation) and human stuttering.

In 2021, researchers investigated the brain tissue from the mice mutants and reported a significant decrease in the number and density of astrocytes in their corpus callosum. Astrocyte is a star-shaped cell in the brain that supports the nerve cells by supplying oxygen and nutrients, and taking away the waste. The corpus callosum enables the communication between the left and right hemispheres of the brain. As of 2020 follow-up experiments with the GNPTAB mutation introduced to brain cell types showed that the vocalization defects in mice were specific to the loss of astrocytes, and mice did not show stuttering-like vocalization defects when the mutation was engineered to other brain cell types.

Dopamine

Recent studies have found that adults who stutter have elevated levels of the neurotransmitter dopamine, and have thus found dopamine antagonists that reduce stuttering (see anti-stuttering medication below). Overactivity of the midbrain has been found at the level of the substantia nigra extended to the red nucleus and subthalamic nucleus, which all contribute to the production of dopamine. However, increased dopamine does not imply increased excitatory function since dopamine's effect can be both excitatory or inhibitory depending upon which dopamine receptors (labelled D1–D5) have been stimulated.

Diagnosis 
Some characteristics of stuttered speech are not as easy for listeners to detect. As a result, diagnosing stuttering requires the skills of a certified speech–language pathologist (SLP). Diagnosis of stuttering employs information both from direct observation of the individual and information about the individual's background, through a case history. Information from both sources should consider things such as age, the various times it has occurred, and other impediments. The SLP may collect a case history on the individual through a detailed interview or conversation with the parents (if client is a child). They may also observe parent-child interactions and observe the speech patterns of the child's parents. The overall goal of assessment for the SLP will be (1) to determine whether a speech disfluency exists, and (2) assess if its severity warrants concern for further treatment.

During direct observation of the client, the SLP will observe various aspects of the individual's speech behaviors. In particular, the therapist might test for factors including the types of disfluencies present (using a test such as the Disfluency Type Index (DTI)), their frequency and duration (number of iterations, percentage of syllables stuttered (%SS)), and speaking rate (syllables per minute (SPM), words per minute (WPM)). They may also test for naturalness and fluency in speaking (naturalness rating scale (NAT), test of childhood stuttering (TOCS)) and physical concomitants during speech (Riley's Stuttering Severity Instrument Fourth Edition (SSI-4)). They might also employ a test to evaluate the severity of the stuttering and predictions for its course. One such test includes the stuttering prediction instrument for young children (SPI), which analyzes the child's case history, part-word repetitions and prolongations, and stuttering frequency in order to determine the severity of the disfluency and its prognosis for chronicity for the future.

Stuttering is a multifaceted, complex disorder that can impact an individual's life in a variety of ways. Children and adults are monitored and evaluated for evidence of possible social, psychological or emotional signs of stress related to their disorder. Some common assessments of this type measure factors including: anxiety (Endler multidimensional anxiety scales (EMAS)), attitudes (personal report of communication apprehension (PRCA)), perceptions of self (self-rating of reactions to speech situations (SSRSS)), quality of life (overall assessment of the speaker's experience of stuttering (OASES)), behaviors (older adult self-report (OASR)), and mental health (composite international diagnostic interview (CIDI)).

Clinical psychologists with adequate expertise can also diagnose Stuttering per the DSM-5 diagnostic codes. The DSM-5 describes Childhood-Onset Fluency Disorder (Stuttering)" for developmental stuttering, and "Adult-onset Fluency Disorder". However, the specific rationale for this change from the DSM-IV is ill-documented in the APA's published literature, and is felt by some to promote confusion between the very different terms "fluency" and "disfluency".

Normal disfluency

Preschool aged children often have difficulties with speech concerning motor planning and execution; this often manifests as disfluencies related to speech development (referred to as normal dysfluency or "other disfluencies"). This type of disfluency is a normal part of speech development and temporarily present in preschool aged children who are learning to speak. These normal disfluencies can present as interjections ("Um"), multisyllable repetitions ("I want I want to do that"), or revised or abandoned utterances ("I want—hey what's that?"). Normal disfluency should be ruled out before diagnosing stuttering.

Classification
Developmental stuttering (also known as childhood onset fluency disorder) is stuttering that originates when a child is learning to speak and may persist as the child matures into adulthood. Stuttering that persists after the age of seven is classified as persistent stuttering.

Other much less common causes of stuttering include neurogenic stuttering (stuttering that occurs secondary to brain damage, such as after a stroke) and psychogenic stuttering (stuttering related to a psychological condition).

Developmental
Stuttering is typically a developmental disorder beginning in early childhood and continuing into adulthood in at least 20% of affected children. The mean onset of stuttering is 30 months. Although there is variability, early stuttering behaviours usually consist of word or syllable repetitions, while secondary behaviours such as tension, avoidance or escape behaviours are absent. Most young children are unaware of the interruptions in their speech. With young stutterers, disfluency may be episodic, and periods of stuttering are followed by periods of relatively decreased disfluency.

Though the rate of early recovery is very high, with time a young person who stutters may transition from easy, relaxed repetition to more tense and effortful stuttering, including blocks and prolongations. Some propose that parental reactions may affect the development of a chronic stutter. Recommendations to "slow down", "take a breath", "say it again", etc., may increase the child's anxiety and fear, leading to more difficulties with speaking and, in the "cycle of stuttering," to yet more fear, anxiety and expectation of stuttering. With time secondary stuttering, including escape behaviours such as eye blinking and lip movements, may be used, as well as fear and avoidance of sounds, words, people, or speaking situations. Eventually, many become fully aware of their disorder and begin to identify themselves as stutterers. With this may come deeper frustration, embarrassment and shame. Other, rarer patterns of stuttering development have been described, including sudden onset with the child being unable to speak, despite attempts to do so. The child usually is unable to utter the first sound of a sentence, and shows high levels of awareness and frustration. Another variety also begins suddenly with frequent word and phrase repetition, and does not include the development of secondary stuttering behaviours.

Neurogenic stuttering
Some stuttering is also believed to be caused by neurophysiology. Neurogenic stuttering is a type of fluency disorder in which a person has difficulty in producing speech in a normal, smooth fashion. Individuals with fluency disorders may have speech that sounds fragmented or halting, with frequent interruptions and difficulty producing words without effort or struggle. Neurogenic stuttering typically appears following some sort of injury or disease to the central nervous system. Injuries to the brain and spinal cord, including cortex, subcortex, cerebellum, and even the neural pathway regions.

Acquired stuttering
In rare cases, stuttering may be acquired in adulthood as the result of a neurological event such as a head injury, tumour, stroke, or drug use. The stuttering has different characteristics from its developmental equivalent: it tends to be limited to part-word or sound repetitions, and is associated with a relative lack of anxiety and secondary stuttering behaviors. Techniques such as altered auditory feedback (see below), which may promote decreasing disfluency in those with the developmental condition, are not effective with the acquired type.

Psychogenic stuttering may also arise after a traumatic experience such as a death, the breakup of a relationship or as the psychological reaction to physical trauma. Its symptoms tend to be homogeneous: the stuttering is of sudden onset and associated with a significant event, it is constant and uninfluenced by different speaking situations, and there is little awareness or concern shown by the speaker.

Differential diagnosis
Other disorders with symptoms resembling stuttering, or associated disorders include autism, cluttering, Parkinson's disease, essential tremor, palilalia, spasmodic dysphonia, selective mutism, and social anxiety.

Treatment

Before beginning treatment, an assessment is needed, as diagnosing stuttering requires the skills of a certified speech–language pathologist (SLP).
While there is no complete cure for stuttering, several treatment options exist that help individuals to better control their speech. Many of the available treatments focus on learning strategies to minimize stuttering through speed reduction, breathing regulation, and gradual progression from single-syllable responses to longer words, and eventually more complex sentences. Furthermore, some stuttering therapies help to address the anxiety that is often caused by stuttering, and consequently worsens stuttering symptoms. This method of treatment is referred to as a comprehensive approach, in which the main emphasis of treatment is directed toward improving the speaker's attitudes toward communication and minimizing the negative impact stuttering can have on the speaker's life. Treatment from a qualified S-LP can benefit stutterers of any age.

Speech language pathologists teach people who stutter to control and monitor the rate at which they speak. In addition, people may learn to start saying words in a slightly slower and less physically tense manner. They may also learn to control or monitor their breathing. When learning to control speech rate, people often begin by practising smooth, fluent speech at rates that are much slower than typical speech, using short phrases and sentences. Over time, people learn to produce smooth speech at faster rates, in longer sentences, and in more challenging situations until speech sounds both fluent and natural. When treating stuttering in children, some researchers recommend that an evaluation be conducted every three months in order to determine whether or not the selected treatment option is working effectively. "Follow-up" or "maintenance" sessions are often necessary after completion of formal intervention to prevent relapse.

Fluency shaping therapy
Fluency shaping therapy, also known as "speak more fluently", "prolonged speech", or "connected speech", trains people who stutter to speak less disfluently by controlling their breathing, phonation, and articulation (lips, jaw, and tongue). It is based on operant conditioning techniques.

People who stutter are trained to reduce their speaking rate by stretching vowels and consonants, and using other disfluency-reducing techniques such as continuous airflow and soft speech contacts. The result is very slow, monotonic, but fluent speech, used only in the speech clinic. After the person who stutters masters these skills, the speaking rate and intonation are increased gradually. This more normal-sounding, fluent speech is then transferred to daily life outside the speech clinic, though lack of speech naturalness at the end of treatment remains a frequent criticism. Fluency shaping approaches are often taught in intensive group therapy programs, which may take two to three weeks to complete.

Modification therapy
The goal of stuttering modification therapy is not to eliminate stuttering but to modify it so that stuttering is easier and less effortful. The rationale is that, since fear and anxiety cause increased stuttering, using easier stuttering and with less fear and avoidance, stuttering will decrease. The most widely known approach was published by Charles Van Riper in 1973 and is also known as block modification therapy. However, depending on the patient, speech therapy may be ineffective.

Electronic fluency device

Altered auditory feedback, so that people who stutter hear their voice differently, has been used for over 50 years in the treatment of stuttering. Altered auditory feedback effect can be produced by speaking in chorus with another person, by blocking out the voice of the person who stutters while they are talking (masking), by delaying slightly the voice of the person who stutters (delayed auditory feedback) or by altering the frequency of the feedback (frequency altered feedback). Studies of these techniques have had mixed results, with some people who stutter showing substantial reductions in stuttering, while others improved only slightly or not at all. In a 2006 review of the efficacy of stuttering treatments, none of the studies on altered auditory feedback met the criteria for experimental quality, such as the presence of control groups.

Mobile applications 

There are specialized mobile applications and PC programs for stutter treatment. The goal pursued by the applications of this kind is speech cycle restoration: I say, I hear, I build a phrase, I say, and so on, using various methods of stutter correction.

The user interacts with the application through altered auditory feedback: they say something into the headset's microphone and listen to their own voice in the headphones processed by a certain method.

The following stutter correction methods are typically used in applications:

 MAF (masking auditory feedback). It is basically masking by white noise or sinus noises of the user's own speech. Scientists believe that people who stutter can speak more smoothly when they do not hear their own speech. This method is considered old-fashioned and ineffective.
 DAF (delayed auditory feedback). This method involves sending the user's voice from a microphone to headphones with a delay of fractions of a second. The goal of this method is to teach people who stutter to prolong vowels and reduce their speech rate. After speech correction with long delays, the application is adjusted at shorter delays which increase the speech rate until it becomes normal.
 FAF (frequency-shifted auditory feedback). This method involves shifting the user's voice tone frequency that they are listening to compared to their own voice. The shift range can be different: from several semitones to half an octave.
 Using metronomes and tempo correctors. Rhythmic metronome strikes are used in this method. The effectiveness of the method is related to the fact that rhythm has positive effect on someone who stutters, especially when pronouncing slowly.
 Using visual feedback. This method determines the user's speech parameters (for instance, speech tempo) and their representation on screen as visual information. The principal goal of the method is allowing the user to effectively manage their voice through achieving the defined targeted parameters. It is supposed that the user sees visual representation of both current and targeted parameters (such as speech tempo) on the screen while pronouncing.

Medications
Although no medication is FDA approved for stuttering, several studies have shown certain medications to have beneficial effects on reducing the severity of stuttering symptoms. Although different classes of medications have been investigated, those with dopamine blocking activity have been shown in numerous trials to have positive effects on stuttering. These medications are FDA approved in the United States and hold similar approval in most countries for other conditions and their safety profiles are well established in these disorders.

The best studied medication in stuttering is olanzapine, whose effectiveness as of 2004 had been established in replicated trials. Olanzapine acts as a dopamine antagonist to D2 receptors in the mesolimbic pathway, and works similarly on serotonin 5HT2A receptors in the frontal cortex. At doses between 2.5 and 5 mg, olanzapine has been shown to be more effective than placebo at reducing stuttering symptoms, and may serve as a first-line pharmacological treatment for stuttering based on the preponderance of its efficacy data. However, other medications are generally better tolerated with less weight gain and less risk of metabolic effects than olanzapine.

As of 2000, Risperidone and haloperidol had also shown effectiveness in the treatment of stuttering. However, haloperidol in particular often result in poor long-term compliance due to concerning side effects such as movement disorders and prolactin elevation, which can also occur with risperidone. Other dopamine active medications reported to positively treat stuttering include aripiprazole, asenapine, lurasidone, which tend to be better tolerated than olanzapine with less weight gain. All these medications as well as olanzapine can carry the potential risk of a long-term movement disorder known as tardive dyskinesia.

The investigational compound, ecopipam, is unique from other dopamine antagonists in that it acts on D1 receptors instead of D2, owing little, if any risk, of movement disorders. A 2019 open label study of ecopipam in adults demonstrated significantly improved stuttering symptoms with no reports of parkinsonian-like movement disorders or tardive dyskinesia which can be seen with D2 antagonists. In addition, ecopipam had no reported weight gain, but instead has been reported to lead to weight loss. In a preliminary study, it was well tolerated in subjects, effectively reduced stuttering severity, and was even associated in a short-term study with improved quality of life in persons who stutter. Further research is still warranted, but this novel mechanism is showing promise in the pharmacologic treatment of stuttering.

Support
With existing behavioral and prosthetic treatments providing limited relief and pharmacologic treatments in need of FDA approval for widespread use, support groups and the self-help movement continue to gain popularity and support from professionals and from people who stutter. Self-help groups provide people who stutter a shared forum within which they can access resources and support from others facing the same challenges of stuttering. One of the basic tenets behind the self-help movement is that since a cure does not exist, quality of life can be improved by not thinking about the stammer for prolonged periods. Psychoanalysis has claimed success in the treatment of stuttering. Hypnotherapy has also been explored as a management alternative. Support groups further focus on the fact that stuttering is not a physical impediment but a psychological one.

Psychological approach 
Cognitive behavior therapy has been used to treat stuttering. Also sociological approaches has been explored regarding how social groups maintain stuttering through social norms.

Diaphragmatic breathing
Several treatment initiatives, for example the McGuire programme and the Starfish Project, advocate diaphragmatic breathing (or costal breathing) as a means by which stuttering can be controlled.

Prognosis
Among preschoolers with stuttering, the prognosis for recovery is good. Based on research, about 65% to 87.5% of preschoolers who stutter recover spontaneously by 7 years of age or within the first 2 years of stuttering, and about 74% recover by their early teens. In particular, girls seem to recover well. For others, early intervention is effective in helping the child overcome disfluency.

Prognosis is guarded with later age of onset: children who start stuttering at age 3½ years or later,
and duration of greater than 6–12 months since onset, that is, once stuttering has become established, and the child has developed secondary behaviors;  only 18% of children who stutter after five years recover spontaneously. Stuttering that persists after the age of seven is classified as persistent stuttering, and is associated with a much lower chance of recovery. However, with treatment young children may be left with little evidence of stuttering.

For adults who stutter, there is no known cure, though they may make partial recovery or even complete recovery with intervention. People who stutter often learn to stutter less severely, though others may make no progress with therapy.

Emotional sequelae associated with stuttering primarily relates to state-dependent anxiety related to the speech disorder itself. However, this is typically isolated to social contexts that require speaking, is not a trait anxiety, and this anxiety does not persist if stuttering remits spontaneously. Research attempting to correlate stuttering with generalized or state anxiety, personality profiles, trauma history, or decreased IQ have failed to find adequate empirical support for any of these claims.

Epidemiology
The lifetime prevalence, or the proportion of individuals expected to stutter at one time in their lives, is about 5%, and overall males are affected two to five times more often than females. However, there is not much information known about the underlying cause for such a skewed sex ratio. Most stuttering begins in early childhood, and studies suggest that 2.5% of children under the age of 5 stutter. As seen in children who have just begun stuttering, there is an equivalent number of boys and girls who stutter. Still, the sex ratio appears to widen as children grow: among preschoolers, boys who stutter outnumber girls who stutter by about a two to one ratio, or less. This ratio widens to three to one during first grade, and five to one during fifth grade, as girls have higher recovery rates. Due to high (approximately 65–75%) rates of early recovery, the overall prevalence of stuttering is generally considered to be approximately 1%.

Cross cultural
Cross-cultural studies of stuttering prevalence were very active in early and mid-20th century, particularly under the influence of the works of Wendell Johnson, who claimed that the onset of stuttering was connected to the cultural expectations and the pressure put on young children by anxious parents. Johnson claimed there were cultures where stuttering, and even the word "stutterer", were absent (for example, among some tribes of American Indians). Later studies found that this claim was not supported by the facts, so the influence of cultural factors in stuttering research declined. It is generally accepted by contemporary scholars that stuttering is present in every culture and in every race, although the attitude towards the actual prevalence differs. Some believe stuttering occurs in all cultures and races at similar rates, about 1% of general population (and is about 5% among young children) all around the world. A US-based study indicated that there were no racial or ethnic differences in the incidence of stuttering in preschool children. At the same time, there are cross-cultural studies indicating that the difference between cultures may exist. For example, summarizing prevalence studies, E. Cooper and C. Cooper conclude: "On the basis of the data currently available, it appears the prevalence of fluency disorders varies among the cultures of the world, with some indications that the prevalence of fluency disorders labeled as stuttering is higher among black populations than white or Asian populations" (Cooper & Cooper, 1993:197). In his "Stuttering and its Treatment: Eleven lectures" Mark Onslow remarked that "one recent study with many participants (N=119,367) convincingly reported more stuttering among African Americans than other Americans. Why this could be the case is challenging to explain ..."

Different regions of the world are researched very unevenly. The largest number of studies has been conducted in European countries and in North America, where the experts agree on the mean estimate to be about 1% of the general population (Bloodtein, 1995. A Handbook on Stuttering). African populations, particularly from West Africa, might have the highest stuttering prevalence in the world—reaching in some populations 5%, 6% and even over 9%. Many regions of the world are not researched sufficiently, and for some major regions there are no prevalence studies at all (for example, in China). Some claim the reason for this might be a lower incidence in the general population in China.

History

Because of the unusual-sounding speech that is produced and the behaviors and attitudes that accompany a stutter, it has long been a subject of scientific interest and speculation as well as discrimination and ridicule. People who stutter can be traced back centuries to the likes of Demosthenes, who tried to control his disfluency by speaking with pebbles in his mouth. The Talmud interprets Bible passages to indicate Moses was also a person who stuttered, and that placing a burning coal in his mouth had caused him to be "slow and hesitant of speech" (Exodus 4, v.10).

Galen's humoral theories were influential in Europe in the Middle Ages for centuries afterward. In this theory, stuttering was attributed to imbalances of the four bodily humors—yellow bile, blood, black bile, and phlegm. Hieronymus Mercurialis, writing in the sixteenth century, proposed methods to redress the imbalance including changes in diet, reduced libido (in men only), and purging. Believing that fear aggravated stuttering, he suggested techniques to overcome this. Humoral manipulation continued to be a dominant treatment for stuttering until the eighteenth century. Partly due to a perceived lack of intelligence because of his stutter, the man who became the Roman emperor Claudius was initially shunned from the public eye and excluded from public office.

In and around eighteenth and nineteenth century Europe, surgical interventions for stuttering were recommended, including cutting the tongue with scissors, removing a triangular wedge from the posterior tongue, and cutting nerves, or neck and lip muscles. Others recommended shortening the uvula or removing the tonsils. All were abandoned due to the high danger of bleeding to death and their failure to stop stuttering. Less drastically, Jean Marc Gaspard Itard placed a small forked golden plate under the tongue in order to support "weak" muscles.

Italian pathologist Giovanni Morgagni attributed stuttering to deviations in the hyoid bone, a conclusion he came to via autopsy. Blessed Notker of St. Gall ( – 912), called Balbulus ("The Stutterer") and described by his biographer as being "delicate of body but not of mind, stuttering of tongue but not of intellect, pushing boldly forward in things Divine," was invoked against stammering.

A famous Briton who stammered was King George VI. George VI went through years of speech therapy, most successfully under Australian speech therapist Lionel Logue, for his stammer. This is dealt with in the Academy Award-winning film The King's Speech (2010) in which Colin Firth plays George VI. The film is based on an original screenplay by David Seidler, who also stuttered until age 16.

Another notable case was that of British Prime Minister Winston Churchill. Churchill claimed, perhaps not directly discussing himself, that "[s]ometimes a slight and not unpleasing stammer or impediment has been of some assistance in securing the attention of the audience ..." However, those who knew Churchill and commented on his stutter believed that it was or had been a significant problem for him. His secretary Phyllis Moir commented that "Winston Churchill was born and grew up with a stutter" in her 1941 book I was Winston Churchill's Private Secretary. She also noted about one incident, "'It's s-s-simply s-s-splendid,' he stuttered—as he always did when excited." Louis J. Alber, who helped to arrange a lecture tour of the United States, wrote in Volume 55 of The American Mercury (1942) that "Churchill struggled to express his feelings but his stutter caught him in the throat and his face turned purple" and that "born with a stutter and a lisp, both caused in large measure by a defect in his palate, Churchill was at first seriously hampered in his public speaking. It is characteristic of the man's perseverance that, despite his staggering handicap, he made himself one of the greatest orators of our time."

For centuries "cures" such as consistently drinking water from a snail shell for the rest of one's life, "hitting a stutterer in the face when the weather is cloudy", strengthening the tongue as a muscle, and various herbal remedies were used. Similarly, in the past people have subscribed to theories about the causes of stuttering which today are considered odd. Proposed causes of stuttering have included tickling an infant too much, eating improperly during breastfeeding, allowing an infant to look in the mirror, cutting a child's hair before the child spoke his or her first words, having too small a tongue, or the "work of the devil".

Some people who stutter, who are part of the disability rights movement, have begun to embrace their stuttering voices as an important part of their identity. In July 2015 the UK Ministry of Defence (MOD) announced the launch of the Defence Stammering Network to support and champion the interests of British military personnel and MOD civil servants who stammer and to raise awareness of the condition.

Bilingual stuttering

Identification 
Bilingualism is the ability to speak two languages. Many bilingual people have been exposed to more than one language since birth and throughout childhood. Since language and culture are relatively fluid factors in a person's understanding and production of language, bilingualism may be a feature that impacts speech fluency. There are several ways during which stuttering may be noticed in bilingual children including the following.
 The child is mixing vocabulary (code mixing) from both languages in one sentence. This is a normal process that helps the child increase their skills in the weaker language, but may trigger a temporary increase in disfluency.
 The child is having difficulty finding the correct word to express ideas resulting in an increase in normal speech disfluency.
 The child is having difficulty using grammatically complex sentences in one or both languages as compared to other children of the same age. Also, the child may make grammatical mistakes. Developing proficiency in both languages may be gradual, so development may be uneven between the two languages.
 Adding a second or third language between the ages of three and five years of age may cause stuttering to increase (become more severe). However, this may be the case only when: (1) the child's first language is not strong or the child is experiencing difficulties in their first language, (2) One language is used more than the other or, (3) the child resists speaking the additional language.

Stuttering may present differently depending on the languages the individual uses. For example, morphological and other linguistic differences between languages may make presentation of disfluency appear to be more or less of a problem depending on the individual case.

Research 
Much research is being conducted to look at the prevalence of stuttering in bilingual populations and the differences between languages. For instance, one study concluded that bilingual children who spoke English and another language had an increased risk of stuttering and a lower chance of recovery from stuttering than monolingual speakers and speakers who spoke solely a language other than English. Another study, though methodologically weak, showed relatively indistinguishable percentages of monolingual and bilingual people who stutter. Due to so much conflicting data, the relationship between bilingualism and stuttering has been called enigmatic, which can demonstrate the intricacies of the topic and encourages more research to be conducted in order to sway the belief of impact the relationship between bilingualism and stuttering has.

In popular culture 

Jazz and Eurodance musician Scatman John wrote the song "Scatman (Ski Ba Bop Ba Dop Bop)" to help children who stutter overcome adversity. Born John Paul Larkin, Scatman spoke with a stutter himself and won the American Speech-Language-Hearing Association's Annie Glenn Award for outstanding service to the stuttering community.

Arkwright, the main protagonist in the BBC sitcom Open All Hours, had a severe stutter that was used for comic effect. Laxman, a supporting character in Indian comedy film Golmaal (2010), had stammering problem.

Stuttering pride 

Stuttering pride (or stuttering advocacy) is a social movement repositioning stuttering as a valuable and respectable way of speaking. The movement seeks to counter the societal narratives in which temporal and societal expectations dictate how communication takes place. In this sense, the stuttering pride movement challenges the pervasive societal narrative of stuttering as a defect and instead positions stuttering as a valuable and respectable way of speaking in its own right. The movement encourages stutterers to take pride in their unique speech patterns and in what stuttering can tell us about the world. It also advocates for societal adjustments to allow stutterers equal access to education and employment opportunities.

Stuttering pride has drawn ideas and inspiration from disability rights, in particular the development of the social model of disability and the neurodiversity paradigm. For instance, the neurodiversity movement has led some in the stuttering community to advocate for what can be gained from the experience of stuttering. Thus, stuttering pride activists advocate for celebration and respect of stuttered speech.

In terms of stuttering therapies, some stuttering pride activists have suggested therapy approaches that focus on fluent speech as the goal can be unhelpful and damaging to those who stammer. Other activists suggest "it is important that a social or cultural model does not entirely exclude medicine or speech therapy”, but is used “to ask critical questions about how some of the assumptions of a curative model of speech might injure dysfluent individuals".

Stammering pride foregrounds an emerging stammering culture. Crucially, stuttering culture highlights the power of creative writers, artists, and musicians to subvert concepts of 'normative' speech through the power of expressive and generative dysfluency. Stuttering pride activists propose stuttering as a form of vocal and linguistic diversity that enriches our language, ideas, and art forms. For instance, the cultural enrichment of stuttering is apparent in musical elements that take the shape of the physical nature of stuttering, including turntablism and scratching. Stuttering has been integral to many popular songs, such as My Generation by The Who, Changes by David Bowie and Ride on Time by Black Box. Parallel forms of creativity inspired by stuttering can also be seen in repeated motifs featured in fine art or graphic design.

See also

 All India Institute of Speech and Hearing
 Dyscravia
 European League of Stuttering Associations
 International Stuttering Awareness Day
 Israel Stuttering Association
 Lists of language disorders
 List of stutterers
 Michael Palin Centre for Stammering Children
 Monster Study
 National Stuttering Association, United States
 Speech–language pathology
 Speech processing
 Stuttering Foundation of America
 The Indian Stammering Association

Notes

References

Further reading

 Alm, Per A. (2005). On the Causal Mechanisms of Stuttering. Doctoral dissertation, Dept. of Clinical Neuroscience, Lund University, Sweden.
 
 
 
 Mondlin, M., How My Stuttering Ended [Case Study, Judith M. Kuster, Minnesota State University, Mankato] http://www.mnsu.edu/comdis/kuster/casestudy/path/mondlin.html
 
 Rockey, D., Speech Disorder in Nineteenth Century Britain: The History of Stuttering, Croom Helm, (London), 1980. 
 Goldmark, Daniel. "Stuttering in American Popular Song, 1890–1930." In

External links 

National Health Institute
American Speech-Language-Hearing association 
The Stuttering Foundation
Australian Stuttering Warriors Inc

 
Mental disorders diagnosed in childhood
Speech disorders